Roger Quilliot (19 June 1925 – 17 July 1998) was a French politician. He served as Housing Minister from May 22 to June 23, 1981, under former French President François Mitterrand. He was also a Socialist member of the French Senate for the Puy-de-Dôme from 1974 to 1981, then from 1983 to April 1998, and again from September 1986  to 1998. He also served as the Mayor of Clermont-Ferrand from 1973 to 1998.

Biography
Roger Quilliot was born on June 19, 1925 in Hermaville, France. He received a PhD and the agrégation in Literature, and he edited the oeuvre of Albert Camus in La Pléiade. He was a personal friend of Camus's. Politically, he was close to Gaston Defferre and Pierre Mauroy.

He committed suicide on July 17, 1998. He was survived by his wife, Claire Quilliot. The Musée d'Art Roger-Quilliot in Clermont-Ferrand was named after him.

Bibliography
La liberté aux dimensions humaines (1967)
L'homme sur le pavois (1982, with Claire Quilliot)
Mémoires (1999, posthumous)
Mémoires II (2001, with Claire Quilliot, posthumous)

References

1925 births
1998 deaths
Government ministers of France
Suicides in France
French Senators of the Fifth Republic
Mayors of Clermont-Ferrand
People from Pas-de-Calais
Socialist Party (France) politicians
French politicians who committed suicide
Senators of Puy-de-Dôme
Politicians from Auvergne-Rhône-Alpes